Emily Smith may refer to:

Emily Smith (author), English children's author
Emily Smith (gymnast) (born 1986), Canadian trampolinist
Emily Smith (singer) (born 1981), Scottish folk singer
Emily Smith (field hockey) (born 1992), Australian field hockey player
Emily Smith (cricketer) (born 1995), Australian cricketer
Emily Smith, 1st Viscountess Hambleden (died 1913), wife of William Henry Smith
Emily Smith (mayor), mayor of Coventry, England
Emily Mae Smith, American artist
Emilie Flygare-Carlén (1807–1892), née Smith